Carlos Irigoyen (born 29 August 1960) is an Argentine sailor. He competed at the 1984 Summer Olympics and the 1988 Summer Olympics.

References

External links
 

1960 births
Living people
Argentine male sailors (sport)
Olympic sailors of Argentina
Sailors at the 1984 Summer Olympics – 470
Sailors at the 1988 Summer Olympics – 470
Place of birth missing (living people)